The 1955 Long Beach State 49ers football team represented Long Beach State College—now known as California State University, Long Beach—as an independent during the 1955 college football season. The was the first year of competition for the program. Led by first-year head coach Mike DeLotto, the 49ers compiled a record of 5–2. The team played home games at Veterans Memorial Stadium adjacent to the campus of Long Beach City College in Long Beach, California.

Schedule

References

Long Beach State
Long Beach State 49ers football seasons
Long Beach State 49ers football